Betong Division, formed on 26 March 2002, is one of the twelve administrative divisions in Sarawak, Malaysia. Formerly part of Sri Aman Division, Betong is in the Saribas area. It has a total area of 4,180.8 square kilometres, and is the smallest of the administrative divisions of Sarawak.

Saribas is famous for its Iban longhouses and is regarded as the center for Iban culture. It was annexed to Sarawak by Rajah James Brooke, after his victory over the Sekrang and Saribas Iban at the Battle of Beting Maru on 31 July 1849.

Betong Division contains two administrative districts: Betong and Saratok. The total population is 99,800. The population is culturally mixed, with the majority Iban interacting well with the Malay and Chinese in almost all spheres of activity since the pre-colonial days.

In Sarawak, Betong has the most administrative sub-districts. The sub-districts under Betong district are Pusa, Spaoh, Debak and Meludam, while those under Saratok district are Roban, Kabong and Budu.

There is about 222 longhouses

Demography 

The population of Betong Division (year 2008 estimate) was 116,700.

Ethnics 

Betong division is traditionally a home to Iban, Malay and Chinese people. Most Ibans are scattered throughout rural areas of Betong and Saratok. Whilst, Malay people are concentrated at the town and major village areas in Betong (especially at Pusa and Maludam area) and Saratok. Chinese people are more concentrated at town areas, such as at Betong and Saratok, while some resides at Pusa. Other races such as Bidayuh, Melanau and Orang Ulu are not native to Betong division. However, due to migration all over Sarawak, more and more of them coming to Betong to settle.

Foreign workers is a rare sight in Betong division. Many of them work in palm oil plantations.

Members of Parliament

Geography and economy 

Betong Division is divided into three broad topographical regions — the coastal or riverine region, the midland region, and the inland or hilly interior region. The coastal or riverine region is mainly made up of peat swamp with very limited suitable area for agricultural activities in its natural condition. In areas with improved irrigation systems, the soil has gradually improved to enable some agricultural activities to be carried out. Some of the crops planted in the coastal or riverine region are wet paddy, sago, coconuts and perennial crops. Some of the coastal or riverine areas have potential for aquaculture activities such as brackish water fish, tiger prawn and crab cultivation. The midland region has more suitable areas for agricultural activities. Crops such as pepper, rubber, paddy, and oil palm are planted in the midland region. Most of the livestock and pond fish rearing are also found in this region. All the commercial livestock in the division area are in this region. The inland or hilly interior region is mountainous with steep terrain and only pockets of the areas are cultivated with hilly paddy, pepper and rubber.

Transportation 

Although Betong is well connected to other parts of Sarawak with good networks of road, river transports still play the vital role in Betong. People of Betong District can opt for rural shuttle bus service to Saratok, even to neighbouring Sarikei and Sri Aman division.

As for people who wish to travel to upriver areas which are inaccessible by road, they have to use available ferry and boat services. River transport charges remain high in Betong Division due to the long distance of the upriver areas.

There are some rural areas which are accessible by timber tracks and palm estate roads. Availability of transports to these areas are limited through bookings at Betong town, using private vans or four-wheel drive vehicles.

Infrastructure 

Pan-Borneo Highway is a trunk road linking Betong to the rest of Sarawak. Betong District is growing rapidly due to being upgraded from a district to a full division status.

Shopping malls 
Medan Mall
Everrise
Doremon
Supersave Discount Store
Nam Leong
Kedai Konyong
Lian Yi

Education 

Betong Division has a moderate number of public schools. Primary schools are scattered throughout Betong and Saratok. Some of them are located deep in the Betong district's interior to cater for rural students.

Primary schools
SK St. Augustine, Betong
SK Abang Abdul Kadir, Betong
SJK (C) Chung Hua, Betong
SJK (C) Chung Hua, Debak
SJK (C) Chung Hua, Meludam
SJK (C) Chung Hua, Pusa
SJK (C) Chung Hua, Spaoh
SK Belingan, Spaoh
SK Tg Asam, Spaoh
SK Bungin, Spaoh
SK Sebemban, Spaoh,
SK Serembang, Spaoh
SK Manggut, Spaoh
SK Buda, Spaoh
SK Supa, Pusa
SK Medang, Pusa
SK Beladin, Pusa
SK Tui, Debak
SK Dit, Debak
SK Tambak, Debak
SK Suri, Debak.
SK Serabang, Pusa
SK Beladin, Pusa
SK Sepinang, Pusa
SK Semarang, Pusa

Secondary schools
SM Teknik Betong
MRSM Betong
SMK Ulu Layar
SMK Kalaka 
SMK Saratok
SMK Kabong
SMK (BM) Saratok
SMK St. Augustine (M)
SMK Spaoh
SMK Datuk Patinggi Kedit
SMK Beladin
SMK Pusa
SMK Saribas

Healthcare 

Betong District has two government hospital which are Betong Hospital and Saratok Hospital, and two government policlinic at each towns. There are no private-owned hospital. As for sub-districts, some has their own health clinic. Smaller government health clinics do exist at major villages and settlement areas.

Security 

Betong division has a police divisional office or IPD. There are also police stations and police bits located at strategic locations, as well as rural areas.

Government services 

Many government offices have set up their branches in Betong Division (fairly at both Betong and Saratok districts) such as Royal Customs, Fire and Rescue Department, Education Department, etc.

See also
 Sarawak
 Betong District
 Saratok District
 Pusa
 Debak
 Spaoh
 Maludam
 Roban
 Budu

References

External links

 Betong Tourism